HelloSociety was a Santa Monica, CA-based social media marketing and technology firm that helped brands partner with influencers. Kyla Brennan is its CEO and founder.

The company was purchased by The New York Times Company in March 2016.

History
HelloSociety started out as HelloInsights, an analytics ad measurement tool, and expanded to a whole suite. The company was the first Pinterest marketing and analytics firm. In 2015, the company expanded its network to include influencers on Instagram, Snapchat, YouTube, and other social media platforms. 

In March 2016, the New York Times Company bought HelloSociety for an undisclosed amount, and it was announced that the company would be integrated with the Times' internal social media agency, T Brand Studio.

Products
HelloSociety’s product suite was made up of five parts: HelloInsights, HelloPartners, HelloBuzz, HelloCreative, and HelloManager.

External links 

Hello Society Website

References

Marketing companies of the United States
Defunct technology companies of the United States